New Julfa ( – Now Jolfā,  – Jolfâ-ye Now;  – Nor Jugha) is the Armenian quarter of Isfahan, Iran, located along the south bank of the Zayande River.

Established and named after the older city of Julfa (Jugha), Nakhchivan in the early 17th century, it is still one of the oldest and largest Armenian quarters in the world (hy).

History

New Julfa was established in 1606 as an Armenian quarter by the edict of Shah Abbas I from the Safavid dynasty. Over 150,000 Armenians were forcibly moved there from Old Julfa (also known as Jugha or Juła) in Nakhchivan (hy) (hy). Iranian sources state that the Armenians came to Iran fleeing the Ottoman Empire's persecution. Nevertheless, historical records indicate that the residents of Julfa were treated well by Shah Abbas in the hopes that their resettlement in Isfahan would be beneficial to Iran due to their knowledge of the silk trade (hy).

Since its foundation, New Julfa was administered by the Lazaryan noble family which moved to Russia after Nader Shah's death in 1747. One of its members, Ivan Lazarev, became a court banker to Catherine the Great and was made an Imperial Count in 1788. His brother established the Lazarev Institute in Moscow.

In 1947, the historian Fernand Braudel wrote that the Armenians had a trade network that stretched from Amsterdam to Manila in the Philippines. Many scholars in Armenia have done pioneering work on this network in the 60s, 70s and 80s. Levon Khachikian and Sushanik Khachikian have edited and published several New Julfan account books. Over the next few centuries, New Julfa became the hub of "one of the greatest trade networks of the early modern era," with outposts as far east as Canton, Surabaya, and Manila, and as far west as Cadiz, London, and Amsterdam, with a few merchants traveling across the Atlantic or Pacific oceans to Acapulco or Mexico City.

A significant majority of Armenian trading families were based in New Julfa. Due to their dispersal, many families that were originally from the older city of Julfa created a main settlement in Bengal expanding the trade network based in New Julfa. However, Some scholars argue that Surat, Bengal and Hughli were independent nodes and that the central control of New Julfa was not as important to their thriving Indian Ocean trade. Many New Julfan Armenians later settled in Manila, Hong Kong, and also in Australia. Their networks have been studied based on Armenian sources. Some also settled in Singapore, where Armenians from New Julfa became the mainstay of the Armenian community in the country. Most were traders, but perhaps better known were the Sarkies (Ter Woskanian) brothers who founded Singapore's Raffles Hotel in 1887.

New Julfa is still an Armenian-populated area with an Armenian school and sixteen churches, including the Holy Savior Cathedral. Armenians in New Julfa observe Iranian law with regard to clothing, but retain a distinct Armenian language, identity, cuisine, and culture which is protected by the Iranian government.

According to David Petrosyan of the Institute for Central Asian and Caucasian Studies, New Julfa had between 10,000–12,000 Armenian inhabitants in 1998. As of today, it is still one of the world's largest ethnic Armenian quarters.

Sites

Churches

Armenian Apostolic
 Holy Savior Cathedral (Surp Amenaprgich, commonly known as the Vank) – 1655
 Saint Jacob Church (Surp Hakop Mdzbena Hayrapet) – 1607
 Saint George Church (Surp Gevork) – 1611
 Holy Mother of God Church (Surp Asdvadzadzin) – 1613
 Saint Stephen Church (Surp Stepanos Nakhavga) – 1614
 Saint John the Baptist Church (Surp Hovannes Mgrditch) – 1621
 Saint Catherine Convent (Surp Katarine) – 1623
 Holy Bethlehem Church (Surp Betłehem) – 1628
 Saint Nicholas Church (Surp Nikołayos Hayrapet) – 1630
 Saint Gregory the Illuminator Church (Surp Grigor Lusavoritch) – 1633
 Saint Sarkis Church (Surp Sarkis) – 1659
 Saint Minas Church (Surp Minas) – 1659
 Saint Nerses Church (Surp Nerses Medz) – 1666

Roman Catholic
 Cathedral of Our Lady of the Rosary (Dominicans) – 1681/1705

Protestant
 Saint Paul Church – 1875
 Seventh-day Adventist – 1957
 Assemblies of God – 1965

Museums
 The museum of Khachatur Kesaratsi, in the compound of the Holy Savior Cathedral

Schools
 Samian (1831–1853) (hy)
 Katarinyan (1858–now) (hy)
 Azgayin Kntronakan (1880–now) (hy)
 Gevorg Kananyan (1905–now) (hy)

Notable people

 Apcar family – merchant family
 Sceriman family – merchant family
 De l'Estoile family – merchant family
 Lazarian family (ru) – noble family
 Sarkies Brothers – businessmen
 Khvajeh Safar (d. 1618) – mayor of Julfa
 Martin the Armenian (hy) (d. 1619) – first Armenian-American / Iranian-American
 Mesrop of Khizan (c.1560–c.1652) – manuscript illuminator
 Stepanos Dzik Jughayetsi (hy) (1583–1647) – writer
 Khachatur Kesaratsi (1590–1646) – archbishop and publisher (hy)
 Khvajeh Petros Velijanian (fa) (d. 1649) – merchant
 Simeon Jughayetsi (ru) (d. 1657) – scholar
 Hakob IV of Julfa (hy) (1598–1680) – Catholicos (1655–80)
 Mirman Mirimanidze (17th century) – mayor of New Julfa
 Otar Beg (1583–1663) – mayor of New Julfa
 Hakop Jughayetsi (ru) (17th century) – manuscript illuminator
 Siet Khachikian (hy) (17th century) – diplomat
 Grigor Usta (hy) (17th century) – architect
 Kostand Jughayetsi (hy) (17th century) – scholar
 Marcara Avanchintz (17th century) – merchant
 Minas (hy) (17th century) – painter
 Hovhannes Jughayetsi Ktreshents (hy) (c.1610–c.1660) – publisher
 Minas Jughayetsi (hy) (1610–1670) – painter
 Mohammad Beg (d. 1671) – mayor of New Julfa
 Voskan Yerevantsi (1614–1674) – publisher
 Hajji Piri (d. 1694) – mayor of New Julfa
 Bogdan Saltanov (1630–1703) – painter
 Hovhannes Mrkouz (hy) (1643–1715) – philosopher
 Egaz Norjughayetsi (hy) (1650–1734) – musician
 Ghul Arzuni (hy) (1650–1750) – musician
 Arapiet di Martin (hy) (1650–1760) – musician
 Stepanos Dashtetsi (ru) (1653–1720) – writer
 Abgar Ali Akbar Armani (d. 1708) – merchant
 Alexander I of Julfa (d. 1714) – Catholicos (1706–14)
 Petros di Sargis Gilanents (ru) (d. 1724) – merchant
 Hagopdjan de Deritchan (d. 1726) – diplomat
 Coja Petrus Uscan (1680–1751) – merchant
 Aghazar di Khachik (hy) (1690–1750) – military man
 Aghazar Lazarian (hy) (1700–1782) – merchant
 Zaccaria Seriman (it) (1709–1784) – writer
 Tovmas Khojamalian (hy) (c.1720–1780) – historian
 Shahamir Shahamirian (1723–1798) – political activist
 Stefano Domenico Sceriman (it) (1729–1806) – writer
 Ivan Lazarevich Lazarev (1735–1801) – jeweller
 Petros Kalantarian (hy) (1735–1???) – physician
 Minas Lazarian (hy) (1737–1809) – politician
 Astvadsatour Babikian (hy) (1738–1825) – writer
 Khachatour Lazarian (hy) (1741–1774) – politician
 Hovakim Lazarian (hy) (1743–1826) – political activist
 Movses Baghramian (18th century) – political activist
 Tadevos Soginian (hy) (18th century) – political activist
 George Manook (1763–1827) – merchant
 Hakob Hovnatanyan (1806–1871) – painter
 Tadevos Avetoumian (hy) (1811–1863) – writer
 Zerouni Masehian (fa) (1811–18??) – goldsmith
 Megrtich Emin (ru) (1815–1890) – scholar
 Minus Megerdich Zorab (1833–1896) – painter
 Tiruhi Ter-Nahapetian (hy) (19th century) – artist
 Mirza Malkam Khan (1834–1908) – politician
 Martiros Khan Davidkhanian (fa) (1843–1905) – general
 Sarkis Khan Davidkhanian (1846-) – general
 Eskandar Khan Davidkhanian – professor and general
 Vittoria Aganoor (1855–1910) – poet
 Minas Manook Basil (Barseghian) (hy) (1857–1922) – physician
 Diana Abgar (1859–1937) – diplomat
 Matevos Aghakhan Karakhanian (fa) (1860–1946) – photographer
 Arathoon Stephen (1861–1927) – businessman
 Hovsep Mirzayan (hy) (1868–1935) – politician
 Mesrovb Jacob Seth (1871–1939) – scholar
 Hovhannes Abkarian (fa) (1875–1931) – musician
 Tigran Abgarian (hy) (1877–1950) – philologist
 Petros Abkar (fa) (1884–19??) – politician
 Megrdich Abgar (hy) (1884–1967) – archbishop
 Mkrtich Hakobian (hy) (1885–1971) – photographer
 Minas Patkerhanian (hy) (1885–1972) – photographer
 Markar Galstiants (fa) (1888–1985) – architect
 Yeghia Velijanian (hy) (1889–1976) – artist
 Guregh Israelian (1894–1949) – Armenian Patriarch of Jerusalem (1944–49)
 Zabel Stepanian-Bartev (fa) (1894–1982) – telegraph technician
 Karo Minassian (hy) (1897–1973) – physician
 Meguertitch Khan Davidkhanian (fa) (1902–1983) – general and politician
 Haykush Ter-Martirosian (hy) (1905–1987) – actress
 Bersabe Hovsepian (hy) (1906–1999) – public figure
 Rafael Atayan (hy) (1907–1990) – writer
 Poghos Petrosian (hy) (1907–19??) – bishop
 Abraham Gurgenian (hy) (1908–1991) – painter
 Annik Shefrazian (1909–1996) – actress
 Aramais Aghamalian (1910–1985) – film director
 Johny Baghdasarian (fa) (1913–1979) – film director
 Sumbat Der Kiureghian (1913–1999) – painter
 Yervand Nahapetian (fa) (1916–2006) – painter
 Emma Abrahamian (fa) (b. 1919) – sculptor
 Alain John (1920–1943) – sculptor
 Alenush Terian (1920–2011) – astronomer and physicist
 Levon Minassian (fa) (1920–2013) – scholar
 Sevak Saginian (fa) (1921–2003) – politician
 Clara Abkar (hy) (1922–1996) – painter
 Hrand Ghoukasian (fa) (1927–1996) – physician and translator
 Arsham Yesayi (fa) (b. 1931) – tennis player
 Neshan Sarkissian (Karekin I) (1932–1999) – Prelate of the Diocese of New Julfa (1971–75), Catholicos of Cilicia (1983–94) and Catholicos of All Armenians (1994–99)
 Nechan Karakéhéyan (b. 1932) – Catholic bishop of New Julfa (2000–05)
 Krzysztof Penderecki (b. 1933) – "Poland's greatest living composer"
 Nikol Faridani (1935–2008) – photographer
 Grish Davtian (hy) (b. 1935) – poet
 Alek Ter-Khachatourian (fa) (b. 1935) – translator
 Grigor Nazarian (hy) (b. 1937) – architect
 Varouj Karapetian (fa) (b. 1938) – film technician
 Arbi Hovhannisian (hy) (b. 1942) – film director
 Sako Ghoukasian (fa) (1943–2015) – opera singer
 George Bournoutian (b. 1943) – scholar
 Megerdich Toumanian (hy) (b. 1943) – mathematician
 Vartan Vartanian (fa) (b. 1943) – politician
 Nelson Shirvanian (hy) (1944–2018) – sculptor
 Tigran Toumanian (fa) (b. 1946) – film technician
 Armen Der Kiureghian (b. 1947) – scholar
 Herach Khachatourian (fa) (b. 1948) – politician
 Caro Lucas (1949–2010) – scholar
 Zaven Ghoukasian (fa) (1950–2015) – film director
 Masis Hambarsounian (b. 1950) – boxer
 Georgik Abrahamian (fa) (b. 1952) – politician
 Artavazd Baghoumian (fa) (b. 1953) – politician
 Jirayr Kocharian (hy) (b. 1955) – cartographer
 Hrant Markarian (b. 1958) – politician and chairman of the Armenian Revolutionary Federation
 Robert Beglarian (b. 1961) – politician
 Vahik Trossian (fa) (b. 1967) – football player
 Nairy Baghramian (b. 1971) – visual artist
 Aren Davoudi (b. 1986) – basketball player
 Oshin Sahakian (b. 1986) – basketball player
 Kajayr Hakopian (hy) (b. 1989) – actor
 Armen Tahmazyan (b. 1990) – football player

Friendly cities
New Julfa has friendly relations with:
 Issy-les-Moulineaux, France

Gallery

See also 
 Armenians in Iran
 List of Armenian ethnic enclaves

References

Sources
 Yves Bomati and Houchang Nahavandi,Shah Abbas, Emperor of Persia,1587-1629, 2017, ed. Ketab Corporation, Los Angeles, English translation by Azizeh Azodi.
 Gregorian, Vartan. “Minorities of Isphahan: The Armenian Community of Isphahan, 1587-1722.” Iranian Studies 7, no. 2 (1974), pp. 652–81.

See also

 Deportation of Armenians to Iran
 Iranian Armenians
 List of Armenian ethnic enclaves
 New Julfa Armenian Cemetery
 Armenian Cemetery in Old Julfa
 Armenian Apostolic Diocese of Isfahan and Southern Iran
 Roman Catholic Archdiocese of Ispahan
 Armenian Catholic Eparchy of Isfahan
 Apcar and Company

External links
 Iran Chamber Society: Historical Churches of Iran
 Armeniapedia: Isfahan
 New Julda, To be..., directed by Arsen Gasparyan – Hayk Documentary Film Studio 
 Julfa in Isfahan - Armenian Churches and Armenians in Iran (Video)
 Armeniapedia: Hin Jugha
 معماری کلیساهای اصفهان – فصلنامه فرهنگی پیمان 

Armenian diaspora communities
Armenian diaspora in the Middle East
Isfahan
1606 establishments in Iran